Shelton Eugene Quarles (born September 11, 1971) is an American football executive and former linebacker who is the director of football operations for the Tampa Bay Buccaneers of the National Football League (NFL). He played college football at Vanderbilt and was signed by the Miami Dolphins as an undrafted free agent in 1994. He also played for the BC Lions and the Buccaneers, the team he played for from 1997 to 2006.

Early years
Quarles is an alumnus of Whites Creek High School in Nashville, Tennessee and was a student and a letterman in football. In football, he won a first-team All-State honors as a senior, and finished his career with 30 sacks, 505 tackles, and five interceptions. He was also a member of National Honor Society. Shelton Quarles graduated from Whites Creek High School in 1990.

Playing career
Quarles played college football in Vanderbilt earning second-team All-Southeastern Conference honors as a senior and signed as an undrafted free agent by the Miami Dolphins in 1994 but was cut in training camp. Quarles then played for two seasons (1995-96) with the Canadian Football League's BC Lions before signing with the Buccaneers as a free agent in 1997.

Quarles helped lead the Buccaneers to their first Super Bowl championship in the 2002 season. Quarles also holds the record for the longest play in Buccaneers' history with a 98-yard interception return for a touchdown against the Green Bay Packers in 2001. On April 24, 2007, it was announced that the Bucs were going to release him before the 2007 NFL Draft after he failed a physical.

Executive career

Tampa Bay Buccaneers
On August 1, 2007, the Buccaneers hired Quarles as a pro scout in their personnel department.

On January 20, 2011, the Buccaneers promoted Quarles to Coordinator of Pro Scouting.

On July 16, 2013, the Buccaneers promoted Quarles to Director of Pro Scouting.

On May 29, 2014, the Buccaneers promoted Quarles to Director of Football Operations.

Personal life
Quarles is married to his wife, Damaris, and have three children together: a daughter, Gabriela Nicole, and sons, Shelton Eugene Jr. and Carlos Antonio. They reside in Tampa Bay, Florida.

Quarles launched the IMPACT Foundation whose mission is to benefit at-risk children, youth, and their families by providing assistance, programs, and events designed to build self-esteem, provide unique life changing opportunities, and beneficiaries to set and achieve life goals.

Upon retiring Quarles was appointed by Florida Governor Charlie Crist to the board of the Tampa Bay Area Regional Transportation Authority. He served in the position until 2009.

References

External links
 Tampa Bay Buccaneers profile

1971 births
Living people
African-American players of American football
African-American players of Canadian football
American football middle linebackers
BC Lions players
Canadian football linebackers
Miami Dolphins players
National Conference Pro Bowl players
People from Nashville, Tennessee
Tampa Bay Buccaneers players
Tampa Bay Buccaneers scouts
Vanderbilt Commodores football players
National Football League executives
National Football League scouts
Tampa Bay Buccaneers executives
Ed Block Courage Award recipients